Pseudognaphalium is a genus of flowering plants in the sunflower family.

Members of the genus are commonly known as cudweeds or rabbit tobacco (P. obtusifolium is the original species with that name). They are  widespread in temperate regions of many countries.

Classification of a number of species is disputed between Pseudognaphalium and the related genus Gnaphalium.

Species
 Species

Formerly placed here

 Helichrysum luteoalbum (L.) Rchb. (as P. luteoalbum (L.) Hilliard & B.L.Burtt)

References

External links
 PLANTS Profile

 
Asteraceae genera